James McMonies (1800 – January 12, 1888) was an Ontario businessman and political figure. He represented Wentworth North in the 1st Canadian Parliament as a Liberal member.

He was born in Kirkcudbright, Scotland in 1800. McMonies owned a farm and operated a sawmill near the town of Waterdown. He also served as reeve of East Flamborough. McMonies represented the North riding of Wentworth in the Legislative Assembly of the Province of Canada from 1865 to Confederation, being elected in a by-election held following the death of William Notman. In 1865, he was named clerk in the 3rd Division Court, Wentworth County. He died in Waterdown at the age of 88.

References

1800 births
1888 deaths
Liberal Party of Canada MPs
Members of the Legislative Assembly of the Province of Canada from Canada West
Members of the House of Commons of Canada from Ontario
Scottish emigrants to pre-Confederation Ontario
People from Kirkcudbright
Politicians from Hamilton, Ontario